ANDOS is a Russian operating system for Electronika BK series computers: BK-0010, BK-0011, and BK-0011M. They were based on the PDP-11 architecture by Digital Equipment Corporation. ANDOS was created in 1990 and released first in 1992. Initially it was developed by Alexey Nadezhin (by whose name the system is named) and later also by Sergey Kamnev, who joined the project. It was the only widespread system on BK series computers that used MS-DOS-compatible file system format. ANDOS used the FAT12 file system on 800 Kb floppy disks. For Electronika BK-0011M and BK-0011, ANDOS could emulate a BK-0010 by loading a BK-0010 read-only memory (ROM) image into BK-0011(M) random-access memory (RAM). In minimal configuration, the system could occupy less than 4 Kb of RAM.

The system was able to support up to 64 disk drives (or hard disk drive partitions), and RAM disks in the computer's memory and tape recording. It could also have read-only access to MicroDOS file system format disks, although in the last version, this function was transferred from system core to the file manager and became optional.

References
 

Elektronika BK operating systems
Assembly language software